Pulborough Brooks is a  biological Site of Special Scientific Interest south of Pulborough in West Sussex. It is part of the Pulborough Brooks nature reserve, which is managed by the Royal Society for the Protection of Birds. It is also part of the Arun Valley Ramsar site, Special Area of Conservation and Special Protection Area.

These wet meadows are crossed by a network of ditches, some of which have a rich aquatic flora and invertebrate fauna, including several which are nationally rare. The site is internationally important for wintering wildfowl and many species of birds breed there, such as lapwing, snipe, garganey, yellow wagtail, grey partridge, skylark, reed bunting and barn owl.

References

Royal Society for the Protection of Birds reserves in England
Tourist attractions in West Sussex
Water-meadows
Horsham District
Geography of West Sussex
Grasslands of the United Kingdom
Sites of Special Scientific Interest in West Sussex
Nature reserves in West Sussex